Adrián Guľa (born 29 June 1975) is a Slovakian football coach and former player who manages DAC Dunajská Streda.

He formerly managed teams including AS Trenčín, Viktoria Plzeň, and Wisła Kraków.

Managerial career
MŠK Žilina have announced that Adrián Guľa will become the club's new coach when Štefan Tarkovič's contract-caretaker status expires summer 2013. Currently AS Trenčín coach will take over on a deal that runs until July 2018.
On 7 May 2018 was announced as Slovakia U21 head coach.

Gul'a was announced as the manager of Wisła Kraków on 6 June 2021. After Wisła could only manage six wins in 21 league games under Gul'a's management, he was dismissed on 13 February 2022.

Honours

Individual
 Fortuna Liga Manager of the season 2016–17

References

External links

 AS Trenčín profile

1975 births
Living people
People from Prievidza District
Sportspeople from the Trenčín Region
Slovak footballers
Slovak football managers
Slovak expatriate football managers
Slovak expatriate footballers
Association football midfielders
Czech First League players
SFC Opava players
FC Baník Prievidza players
FK Jablonec players
MŠK Púchov players
FK Viktoria Žižkov players
FK Inter Bratislava players
Slovak Super Liga players
AS Trenčín managers
MŠK Žilina managers
Slovakia national under-21 football team managers
FC Viktoria Plzeň managers
Wisła Kraków managers
FC DAC 1904 Dunajská Streda managers
Slovak Super Liga managers
Czech First League managers
Expatriate footballers in the Czech Republic
Expatriate football managers in the Czech Republic
Slovak expatriate sportspeople in the Czech Republic
Expatriate football managers in Poland
Slovak expatriate sportspeople in Poland